NGD-4715 is a drug developed by Neurogen, which acts as a selective, non-peptide antagonist at the melanin concentrating hormone receptor MCH1. In animal models it has anxiolytic, antidepressant, and anorectic effects, and it has successfully passed Phase I clinical trials in humans.

Neurogen was acquired by Ligand Pharmaceuticals in August, 2009, and NGD-4715 was not listed among its key assets.  All four laboratories were closed and sold, and no employees were retained.

The structure of NGD-4715 has been confused with for example  1-(5-bromo-6-methoxypyridin-2-yl)-4-(3,4-dimethoxybenzyl)piperazine.

References 

Antidepressants
Anxiolytics
Anorectics
Pyridines
Phenol ethers
Abandoned drugs